Baron Jermyn, of St Edmundsbury, was a title in the Peerage of England.

It was created in 1643 for Henry Jermyn, with remainder, failing heirs male of his own, to his nephews. In 1660 he was further honoured when he was made Earl of St Albans, with normal remainder to the heirs male of his body. On Lord St Alban's death in 1684 the earldom became extinct while he was succeeded in the barony according to the special remainder by his nephew, the second Baron. He had earlier represented Bury St Edmunds in Parliament.

On his death the title passed to his younger brother, the third Baron. He had already been created Baron Dover in 1685. In 1689 the deposed James II created him Baron Jermyn of Royston, Baron Ipswich, Viscount Cheveley and Earl of Dover in the Jacobite Peerage. However, these titles were not recognised by the English government, although Jermyn was generally known as the Earl of Dover. All the titles became extinct on Jermyn's death in 1708.

The family seat was Rushbrooke Hall in Rushbrooke, Suffolk.

Barons Jermyn (1643)
Henry Jermyn, 1st Earl of St Albans, 1st Baron Jermyn (c. 1604–1684)
Thomas Jermyn, 2nd Baron Jermyn (d. 1703) 
Henry Jermyn, 3rd Baron Jermyn, 1st Baron Dover (c. 1636–1708)

References

1643 establishments in England
Extinct baronies in the Peerage of England
Jermyn family
Noble titles created in 1643
Peerages created with special remainders